Bahmani (also Romanized as Bahmanī; also known as Kūhmenī) is a village in Howmeh Rural District, in the Central District of Minab County, Hormozgan Province, Iran. At the 2006 census, its population was 681, in 138 families.

References 

Populated places in Minab County